Pier Francesco Prina (early 18th century) was an Italian painter. He was a native of Novara. He was living in 1718. He painted some of the decoration, along with the painter Francesco Pozzi of Valsoldo, for the Basilica of San Gaudienzo in Novara.

References

18th-century Italian painters
Italian male painters
Painters from Piedmont
Italian Baroque painters
People from Novara
Year of death unknown
Year of birth unknown
18th-century Italian male artists